The laggar falcon (Falco jugger),  also known as the lugger falcon or jugger (from Hindi जग्गर — jaggar, “falcon”) is a mid-sized bird of prey which occurs in the Indian subcontinent from extreme southeastern Iran, southeastern Afghanistan, Pakistan, through India, Nepal, Bhutan, Bangladesh and northwestern Myanmar.

It resembles the lanner falcon but is darker overall, and has blackish "trousers" (tibiotarsus feathers). Fledglings have an almost entirely dark underside, and first-year subadult birds still retain much dark on the belly.

This species belongs to a close-knit complex of falcons known as hierofalcons. In this group, there is ample evidence for rampant hybridization and incomplete lineage sorting which confounds analyses of DNA sequence data to a massive extent; molecular studies with small sample sizes can simply not be expected to yield reliable conclusions in the entire hierofalcon group. The radiation of the entire living diversity of hierofalcons seems to have taken place in the Eemian interglacial at the start of the Late Pleistocene, a mere 130,000-115,000 years ago; the laggar falcon represents a lineage that arrived at its present range out of eastern Africa by way of the Arabian Peninsula which during that time had a more humid climate than today.

Laggar falcons used to be the most common falcons in the region, but numbers have declined markedly in recent times and today it is probably nowhere a common species anymore. The main threats are the intensification of pesticide use in the region and use as a decoy to trap large falcons.

Gallery

References

 Helbig, A.J.; Seibold, I.; Bednarek, W.; Brüning, H.; Gaucher, P.; Ristow, D.; Scharlau, W.; Schmidl, D. & Wink, Michael (1994): Phylogenetic relationships among falcon species (genus Falco) according to DNA sequence variation of the cytochrome b gene. In: Meyburg, B.-U. & Chancellor, R.D. (eds.): Raptor conservation today: 593–599. PDF fulltext
 Nittinger, F.; Haring, E.; Pinsker, W.; Wink, Michael & Gamauf, A. (2005): Out of Africa? Phylogenetic relationships between Falco biarmicus and other hierofalcons (Aves Falconidae). Journal of Zoological Systematics and Evolutionary Research 43(4): 321–331.  PDF fulltext
Wink, Michael; Seibold, I.; Lotfikhah, F. & Bednarek, W. (1998): Molecular systematics of holarctic raptors (Order Falconiformes). In: Chancellor, R.D., Meyburg, B.-U. & Ferrero, J.J. (eds.): Holarctic Birds of Prey: 29–48. Adenex & WWGBP. PDF fulltext
 Wink, Michael; Sauer-Gürth, Hedi; Ellis, David & Kenward, Robert (2004): Phylogenetic relationships in the Hierofalco complex (Saker-, Gyr-, Lanner-, Laggar Falcon). In: Chancellor, R.D. & Meyburg, B.-U. (eds.): Raptors Worldwide: 499–504. WWGBP, Berlin. PDF fulltext

External links
BirdLife Species factsheet
Sound recordings from Xeno-canto.org

laggar falcon
Birds of South Asia
Birds of Myanmar
laggar falcon
laggar falcon